Unicorn fish may refer to:

 Naso (fish), a genus in family Acanthurida
 Unicorn leatherjacket (Aluterus monoceros), family Monacanthidae
 Unicorn crestfish (Eumecichthys fiski), family Lophotidae
 Unicorn grenadier (Coelorinchus productus), family Macrouridae